A , also called a food museum, is generally a single place with many food shops selling the same kind of food, or a food 'theme'. A food theme park, unlike a conventional theme park, is located indoors. Food theme parks are mostly located in Japan where they are called by the English figure of speech.

Notable food theme parks

References

Japanese cuisine